Thailand were the defending champions having won the event in 2011 and they successfully defended their title, defeating Philippines in the final, 2–1.

Medalists

Draw

First round

Semifinals

Final

References

Draw

Women's Team
Women's sports competitions in Singapore